Radio Free Albemuth is a dystopian novel by Philip K. Dick, written in 1976 and published posthumously in 1985. Originally titled VALISystem A, it was his first attempt to deal in fiction with his experiences of early 1974. When his publishers at Bantam requested extensive rewrites he canned the project and reworked it into the VALIS trilogy. Arbor House acquired the rights to Radio Free Albemuth in 1985. They then published an edition under the current title (the original was too close to VALIS), prepared from the corrected typescript given by Dick to his friend Tim Powers.

Plot summary
In this alternate history, the corrupt United States president Ferris F. Fremont (FFF for 666, ‘F’ being the 6th letter in the alphabet) becomes Chief Executive in the late 1960s following Lyndon Johnson's administration. The character is best described as an amalgam of Joseph McCarthy and Richard Nixon, who abrogates civil liberties and human rights through positing a conspiracy theory centered on a (presumably) fictitious subversive organization known as "Aramchek". In addition to this, he is associated with a right-wing populist movement called "Friends of the American People" (FAPers).

The President's paranoia and opportunism lead to the establishment of a real resistance movement that is organized through narrow-beam radio transmissions from a mysterious alien near-Earth satellite by a superintelligent, extraterrestrial, but less than omnipotent being (or network) named VALIS.

Like its successor VALIS, this novel is autobiographical. Dick himself is a major character, though fictitious protagonist Nicholas Brady serves as a vehicle for Dick's alleged gnostic theophany on February 11, 1974. In addition, Sadassa Silvia is a character who claims that Ferris Fremont is actually a communist covert agent recruited by Sadassa's mother when Fremont was still a teenager.

As with VALIS, Radio Free Albemuth deals with Dick's highly personal style of Christianity (or Gnosticism). It further examines the moral and ethical repercussions of informing on trusted friends for the authorities. Also prominent is Dick's dislike of the Republican Party, satirizing Nixon's America as a Stalinist or neo-fascist police state. Fremont eventually captures and imprisons Dick and Brady after the latter attempts to produce and distribute a record that contains subliminal messages of revolt against the current dictatorship. Brady and Silvia are executed, and Dick narrates the concluding passage about his life in a concentration camp, while his supposedly latest work is actually penned by a ghost writer and regime-approved hack. Suddenly, however, he hears music blaring from a transistor radio which contains the same subliminal message. He and his friends, it turns out, were just a decoy set up by VALIS to deter the government from stopping a much more popular A-List band from releasing a similar record with a better-established recording company. As Dick realizes this and hears youngsters repeating the lyrics, he realizes that salvation may lie within the hearts and minds of the next generation.

Reception
Gerald Jonas of The New York Times thought that the novel "may have been merely a first draft (and an abandoned first draft at that), but this book is not Dick at his best. "

Dave Langford reviewed Radio Free Albemuth for White Dwarf #92, and stated that "Dick: understood fear and corruption too well. I was less convinced by the visionary passages, though there's a great line when nervy politicians destroy the alien satellite: 'They shot down God.'"

J. Michael Caparula reviewed Radio Free Albemuth in Space Gamer/Fantasy Gamer No. 80. Caparula commented that "The final result presents a satisfying (albeit enigmatic) conclusion to his trilogy of Valis novels (Valis and The Divine Invasion being the other two)."

Relationship to VALIS
When he rewrote Radio Free Albemuth as VALIS, Dick incorporated the plotline of Radio Free Albemuth as a backdrop film (also titled VALIS) that recapitulated the central theological and existential concerns of his novel as a mise en abyme - that is, a miniature copy of his central preoccupations at this stage of his literary career, common to both works. The word "albemuth" was derived by Dick from the Arabic word Al Behemoth, "the whale", itself an oblique reference to Fomalhaut, the star Dick at one time believed VALIS came from in real life.

Film adaptation

John Alan Simon wrote, produced and directed a film adaptation of Radio Free Albemuth. Canadian singer-songwriter Alanis Morissette stars as Sadassa Silvia. Filming took place in October 2007 at Los Angeles' Lacy Street Studios and multiple other locations. The film premiered in February 2010 at the Sedona Film Festival as a work in-progress. It was released as a limited release (and VOD) on June 27, 2014.

References

Sources

External links

1985 American novels
1976 science fiction novels
American novels adapted into films
Dystopian novels
Novels by Philip K. Dick
Novels published posthumously
Fiction set in 1974
American alternate history novels
Arbor House books
Science fiction novels adapted into films